A. tinctoria may refer to:

 Alkanna tinctoria, the alkanet or dyers' bugloss, a plant species
 Anchusa tinctoria, a plant species in the genus Anchusa
 Anthemis tinctoria, the golden marguerite or yellow chamomile, a plant species

Synonyms
 Aechmea tinctoria, a synonym for Aechmea bromeliifolia

See also
 Tinctoria